WREB is a radio station licensed to Greencastle, Indiana, broadcasting at 94.3 MHz on FM.  Although primarily a music broadcaster, WREB serves as a source of local information, weather and sports broadcasting for Putnam County, Indiana.  WREB began broadcasting on May 16, 1966.

External links
 WREB website

References

REB
Putnam County, Indiana
Full service radio stations in the United States
Radio stations established in 1966
1966 establishments in Indiana